The 2018–19 National Cricket League was the twentieth edition of the National Cricket League (NCL), a first-class cricket competition that was held in Bangladesh. The tournament started on 1 October 2018, with eight teams placed into two tiers. Khulna Division were the defending champions.

The opening round of matches saw a total of thirteen centuries made by twelve different batsman, the first time this had happened at the start of a cricket tournament in Bangladesh. Round four of the tournament produced the two narrowest victories in the history of the NCL, with Sylhet Division winning their match against Dhaka Metropolis by three runs, and Rangpur Division beating Barisal Division by five runs.

Rajshahi Division won the tournament, to claim their sixth title in the competition, after beating Barisal Division by six wickets in the final round of matches. In Tier 2, Dhaka Division were promoted for the next season.

Fixtures

Tier 1
Points table

Tier 2
Points table

References

External links
 Series home at ESPN Cricinfo

2018-19
Bangladesh National Cricket League
2018 in Bangladeshi cricket
2019 in Bangladeshi cricket
Bangladeshi cricket seasons from 2000–01